"Fire From Heaven" was a company-wide comics crossover event story arc published by American company WildStorm in 1996. The story ran across at least one issue of most WildStorm titles at the time and several independent one-shots. The story tied into many events happening in the WildStorm universe and, unlike many major crossovers of the time, Fire From Heaven had a lasting impact on many of the characters involved.

History
The crossover was one of the biggest ever in comics, but had its share of problems; for example, delayed issues caused the planned reading order to change almost monthly, so much that the finalé, planned to take place in Fire from Heaven #2, had to take place in Deathblow #28. 
Also, mandated participation in the crossover meant that many writers had to stop their own storylines to follow the storyline of the crossover. This had the side effect that none of the issues involved were self-contained and readers had to buy the whole crossover to understand the story, even with short recaps in each issue.

Plot 
The story dealt with the coming of Damocles (an alternate reality version of Dr. Tsung), an insane villain from another universe. On Earth, Damocles' opponent from his homeworld had been reborn as the superhero Sigma. Damocles was assisted in his quest by the Sword (an alternate reality version of Union), a group of alien bounty hunters, including One-Eyed Jack, Jade, Rake, Hardball and Tode, the fake Kaizen Gamorra and Miles Craven. Most of the story took place on the island-state Gamorra, with a finale on the moon that involved most of Earth's superheroes.

Consequences

 Deathblow sacrificed  himself to defeat the main villain of the event, Damocles.
 Miles Craven, head of International Operations and a major villain in the Wildstorm Universe, died.
 Kaizen Gamorra, another major villain, was unmasked as an imposter and killed. The real Kaizen Gamorra would be restored as ruler of Gamorra and would prove to be even more of a villain.
 DV8 was sent on its first mission.
 Gen¹³ member Caitlin Fairchild was reunited with her father.
Burnout found out his father was John Lynch.
 Grifter rejoined the WildC.A.T.s. Spartan recovered memories of his life as Kherubim Lord and member of Team One.
 Union came out of retirement, leading into a new series for the hero.
 Stormwatch member Flashpoint was revealed to be a traitor to the team and was killed.
 The origin of the Gen-Factor was revealed: Sigma. The Gen-Factor was the source of superhuman powers for many characters in the Wildstorm Universe, including Team 7, Gen 12, Gen¹³ and DV8.
 Cyberjack, the long-running member of Backlash's supporting cast, died during the incident.
 Backlash discovered that he had a son, Aries.

Reading order
 Fire From Heaven #½
Prelude
 Sword Of Damocles #1 
 Sigma #1 
 Deathblow #26
Chapters
 Fire From Heaven #1 
 Backlash #19 
 Gen¹³ #10 
 Wetworks #16
 Stormwatch #35
 Sigma #2
 WildC.A.T.s #29
 Deathblow #27
 Gen¹³ #11
 Backlash #20
 Wetworks #17 
 Stormwatch #36
 WildC.A.T.s #30
 Sigma #3 
Finale
 Sword Of Damocles #2 
 Fire From Heaven #2 
 Deathblow #28

References

Comics about parallel universes